WYGH (1440 AM) is a radio station licensed to Paris, Kentucky, United States, serving the Lexington area. It is a simulcast of what is broadcast on WIOK 107.5 FM in Falmouth, Kentucky.  The station is currently owned by Hammond Broadcasting, Inc.

References

External links

YGH
Paris, Kentucky
Gospel radio stations in the United States